Bungle, the Glass Cat is a character in the Oz books of L. Frank Baum.

History
Bungle first appears in The Patchwork Girl of Oz, the seventh of Baum's fourteen Oz books. The magician Dr. Pipt tests his Powder of Life by animating an ornamental glass cat figurine, for the specific purpose of catching mice for his wife Margolotte. But the Glass Cat turns out to be exceptionally vain, and unwilling to do any work. Margolotte names it Bungle. The Glass Cat is transparent, except for her hard blood-red ruby heart, two large emeralds for eyes, and her bright pink brains, which look rather like a collection of marbles and can be seen working in the cat's head. She has a tail of spun-glass.

In personality, Bungle is almost stereotypically catlike—cool and reserved and aloof as well as vain. The cat "is so determined not to show emotion that when implored to bring help she sets off very slowly and runs only when out of sight." Baum was unusual in creating a character that is transparent but visible. (Baum magically animates a spun-glass animal in an earlier story, though the dog is not transparent but pink, with a blue ribbon around its neck and shiny black glass eyes.)

Through its incessant prowling throughout the Land of Oz, however, the Glass Cat has acquired intimate knowledge of its complex terrain; and it is generally willing to exploit this knowledge to the benefit of Dorothy and her friends. In The Magic of Oz, for example, the Glass Cat guides the rescue party that saves Trot and Cap'n Bill from entrapment on the Magic Isle. And the Cat is virtually invulnerable to harm, which is a great advantage in its various adventures.

It was quickly reasoned that it was Bungle's pink brains that had made her so conceited, and the Wizard of Oz eventually replaced them with clear ones to make her more agreeable. After her adventures with Ojo the Lucky and the Patchwork Girl, the Cat ended up being a pet of Princess Ozma in the Emerald City.

Oz Books and Short Stories Featuring Bungle
Although never a main character in the Oz books considered canonical by Oz enthusiasts, Bungle has captured a number of author's imaginations and appeared more prominently in later publications.

 Bungle and the Magic Lantern of Oz (1992) - A story by Greg Gick with Bungle as the protagonist.
 The Glass Cat of Oz (1997) - David Hulan makes Bungle his protagonist in The Glass Cat of Oz. 
 The Ruby Heart (1999) - Michael O. Riley also breaks the Cat, in two pieces, in his short story "The Ruby Heart." 
 The Blue Witch of Oz (2000) - Eric Shanower employs the Glass Cat in his 1992 graphic novel The Blue Witch of Oz. 
 The Hidden Prince of Oz (2000) - Gina Wickwar features the character in her The Hidden Prince of Oz. 
 Cinderella: Fables are Forever (2012) - The cat also makes an appearance in the Fables spin-off Cinderella: Fables are Forever, working with Dorothy Gale.
 Bungle of Oz (2013) - A novella with Bungle as the protagonist on an adventure in Gillikin Country and the Land of Ev. Bungle interacts with other Oz characters in the book including the Jinnicky the Red Jinn, the gravel men, and Jellia Jamb.

Others
Bungle appears in "Welcome to the Bungle" in Dorothy and the Wizard of Oz. Unlike her book counterpart, Bungle acts like a real cat as she chases a mouse around Emerald City.

References

Oz (franchise) characters
Cats in literature
Animals of Oz
Literary characters introduced in 1913
Female characters in literature
Fictional cats